Xeropicta is a genus of small air-breathing land snails, pulmonate gastropod mollusks in the subfamily Helicellinae of the family Geomitridae, the hairy snails and their allies.

Distribution 
The distribution of the genus Xeropicta includes south-eastern Europe to Near East and north-eastern Africa.

Species in this genus have not yet become established in the USA, but they are considered to represent potentially serious threats as pests, invasive species which could negatively affect agriculture, natural ecosystems, human health or commerce. Therefore it has been suggested that these species be given top national quarantine significance in the USA.

Description 
The shell is always white with brown spiral bands. The shell is medium-sized to small with a subdepressed to subconoidal spire. The umbilicus is open.

Reproductive system: There is a presence of two symmetrical dart sacs and two long accessory sacs, which are always longer than the dart sacs. There are 4 branched mucus glands around the vagina and penis is with penial appendix at its base. Penis is innervated from the right cerebral ganglion.

Species 
Species within the genus Xeropicta include:
 Xeropicta akrotirica Gittenberger, 1991
 Xeropicta akrotirica E. Gittenberger, 1991
 Xeropicta candaharica (L. Pfeiffer, 1846)
 Xeropicta derbentina (Krynicki, 1836) 
 Xeropicta ilanae Forcart, 1981
 Xeropicta krynickii (Krynicki, 1833) - type species
 Xeropicta ledereri (Pfeiffer, 1856)
 Xeropicta mesopotamica (Mousson, 1874)
 Xeropicta parableta (O. Boettger, 1881)
 Xeropicta smyrnocretica (Germain, 1933)
 Xeropicta vestalis (Pfeiffer, 1841)
 Xeropicta zeevbari Mienis & Rittner, 2020

References
This article incorporates public domain text from the reference

External links 

Geomitridae